The British 10 miles athletics champions covers the AAA Championships from 1880-1972. The event was discontinued after 1972.

Where an international athlete won the AAA Championships the highest ranking UK athlete is considered the National Champion in this list.

Past winners

References

10 miles metres
British
British Athletics Championships